Fear Itself may refer to:

Music 
Fear Itself (band), a 1960s rock band
Fear Itself (Fear Itself album) (1969)
Fear Itself (Casual album) (1994)
Xenophobe/Fear Itself, a 2015 EP by Zao

Film and television
Fear Itself (film), a 2015 film by Charlie Lyne
Fear Itself (TV series), a 2008 NBC horror anthology series
"Fear Itself" (The Outer Limits), a 1998 episode of The Outer Limits
"Fear, Itself", a 1999 episode of Buffy the Vampire Slayer
"Fear Itself" (The 4400), a 2007 episode of The 4400
"Fear Itself" (K-9), an episode of K-9

Literature 
 Fear Itself (Doctor Who novel), a 2005 Doctor Who novel by Nick Wallace
 "Fear Itself" (comics), a 2011 storyline published by Marvel Comics

Other uses
Fear Itself (role-playing game), published by Pelgrane Press in 2007

See also
First inauguration of Franklin D. Roosevelt, during which Roosevelt gave the speech that contained the line "the only thing we have to fear is fear itself."
Nothing to fear but fear itself (disambiguation)